Denzel Mahoney (born January 18, 1998) is an American professional basketball player for the Austin Spurs of the NBA G League. He played college basketball for the Creighton Bluejays and the Southeast Missouri State Redhawks.

High school career
Mahoney attended Paul J. Hagerty High School in Oviedo, Florida. He was named Florida 8A State Player of the Year as a junior. He suffered a torn ACL during an Amateur Athletic Union game and missed his senior season while rehabilitating. Mahoney committed to playing college basketball for Southeast Missouri State.

College career
As a freshman at Southeast Missouri State, Mahoney averaged 14.9 points per game and earned Ohio Valley Conference (OVC) Freshman of the Year honors and a spot on the all-OVC second team. He followed this up by raising his scoring average to 19.3 points per game in his second season and garnered first-team All-OVC accolades. Following his sophomore season, Mahoney transferred from the Redhawks, ultimately settling on Creighton.

After transferring, Mahoney sat out the 2018–19 season per NCAA rules. He became eligible on December 17 the following season. He led all Big East Conference non-starters in scoring at 12 points per game and was awarded the Big East Sixth Man Award. Following the season, Mahoney declared for the 2020 NBA draft, but ultimately returned for his final season. As a senior, he averaged 12.5 points and 4.1 rebounds per game. Mahoney declared for the 2021 NBA draft, forgoing his final season of eligibility that was granted by the NCAA due to the COVID-19 pandemic.

Professional career

Austin Spurs (2021–present)
After going undrafted in the 2021 NBA Draft, Mahoney joined the Charlotte Hornets for the 2021 NBA Summer League and on October 6, 2021, he signed with the San Antonio Spurs. However, he was cut from training camp before opening night. On October 27, he signed with the Austin Spurs as an affiliate player.

References

External links
Creighton Bluejays bio
Southeast Missouri Redhawks bio
College stats @ basketball-reference.com

1998 births
Living people
21st-century African-American sportspeople
African-American basketball players
American men's basketball players
Austin Spurs players
Basketball players from Florida
Creighton Bluejays men's basketball players
People from Oviedo, Florida
Shooting guards
Small forwards
Southeast Missouri State Redhawks men's basketball players